Roger Hunt  (20 July 1938 – 27 September 2021) was an English professional footballer who played as a forward.

Eleven years with Liverpool, he was the club's record goalscorer with 286 goals until being overtaken by Ian Rush. Nonetheless, Hunt remains Liverpool's record league goalscorer with 244 goals. Under Bill Shankly, Hunt won two league titles and an FA Cup. In August 1964 he also scored the first ever goal seen on the BBC's Match of the Day. Regarded as one of Liverpool's greatest ever players, Hunt is referred to as Sir Roger by the club's fans, ranking 13th on the 100 Players Who Shook the Kop, an official fan poll.

Hunt was a member of the England national team which won the 1966 FIFA World Cup, playing in all England's six games, scoring three times. Hunt was inducted into the English Football Hall of Fame in 2006.

Club career

Early career
Born in Glazebury, Lancashire, Hunt played for Croft Youth Club, Stockton Heath and Devizes Town during his formative years.

Liverpool
He was signed for Liverpool by manager Phil Taylor in July 1958, joining from Stockton Heath. Hunt made his debut and scored his first goal for the club on 9 September 1959 in a Second Division fixture at Anfield against Scunthorpe United; Hunt scored in the 64th minute to give the Reds a 2–0 victory. This goal was the first of many – he went on to score 286 goals for the club, 244 of them in the league, which remains a club record.

After Bill Shankly replaced Taylor, Shankly and his fellow 'Boot Room' coaching staff embarked upon a clear out of 24 players. Hunt however was retained and was a major factor in the Reds' success in the 1960s. Liverpool gained promotion to the First Division in 1962, after the club had finished 3rd or 4th, and thus just outside the promotion spots for five consecutive years from 1956 to 1961. Hunt appeared in 41 of the 42 league games and scored 41 goals in season 1961–1962. His goals helped propel Liverpool to a comfortable eight point title win over runners-up Leyton Orient and included five hat-tricks, coming against Leeds United, Walsall, Swansea Town, former club Bury and Middlesbrough. It was a similar story in 1963–64 and 1965–66 as Liverpool were English League champions. Hunt again the top scorer (as he was for eight straight seasons) scoring 31 goals from 41 games and 29 goals from 37 appearances respectively. On 22 August 1964, Hunt scored against Arsenal after 11 minutes in a 3–2 home win, the first ever goal seen on the BBC's flagship football highlights programme Match of the Day.

In between the two titles, in 1965 he was instrumental in the side winning the FA Cup for the first time. Hunt scored four times in a cup run that saw West Bromwich Albion, Stockport County, Bolton Wanderers, Leicester City and Chelsea all defeated as Liverpool reached the final for the first time since 1950. In the final, after a goal-less 90 minutes, Hunt scored the opening goal in the 93rd minute and strike partner Ian St. John scored the second as the Reds recorded a 2–1 victory over Leeds United at Wembley. He scored Liverpool's only goal in the final of the Cup Winners Cup the following year, as they lost 2–1 after extra time to Borussia Dortmund.

He became Liverpool's record goalscorer on 7 November 1967 in an Inter-Cities Fairs Cup tie against TSV 1860 Munich of West Germany, in which he scored his 242nd goal for the club. His final tally for the club was 286 goals by the time he left the club in 1969 to join Bolton Wanderers, a record that was not broken until Ian Rush 23 years later. He also held the record of scoring 100 top-flight goals in fewer games (152) than any player in Liverpool history, until Mohamed Salah reached the milestone in one game less in September 2021.

Later career
He signed for Bolton Wanderers in December 1969. In 1971, he moved on loan to Hellenic F.C. in South Africa's National Football League. He retired in 1972, and had a testimonial with Liverpool in April 1972, attended by 56,000 people.

International career
Hunt was capped 34 times for his country, with his debut given to him by Walter Winterbottom whilst he was still a Second Division player on 4 April 1962, in a friendly against Austria at Wembley. He scored on his international debut as England won 3–1. He was part of the England squad at the 1962 FIFA World Cup in Chile, but was not selected to play.

England had been chosen to host the 1966 FIFA World Cup, and Hunt, along with Liverpool club mates Ian Callaghan and Gerry Byrne, were selected by manager Alf Ramsey for the 22-man squad.
Hunt was one of three forwards selected for the tournament. He initially partnered Tottenham Hotspur striker Jimmy Greaves up front, but following a leg injury to Greaves he played alongside Geoff Hurst of West Ham United.
He played in all six games, scoring three times, twice against France and once against Mexico, as England went on to win the Jules Rimet trophy after a 4–2 extra time win over West Germany in the World Cup Final at Wembley.

Later and personal life
After retiring as a player, he joined his brother Peter, in taking over Hunt Brothers, as the third generation of the family-run haulage business. It was originally established by Richard and Harry Hunt in 1929.

In 2000 he was awarded a MBE for his World Cup victory. He continued to be known as "Sir" Roger Hunt by the Liverpool supporters, despite the absence of a formal knighthood.

Hunt was inducted into the English Football Hall of Fame in 2006, recognising his achievements in the English game. He was voted at number 13 by Liverpool fans on the official Liverpool Football Club in the 100 Players Who Shook The Kop poll, also in 2006. In 2016 he was made an Honorary Freeman of the Borough of Warrington.

Hunt was married in 1959 to Patricia O'Brien and they had two children. He lived with his second wife Rowan (Green), near Warrington.

Hunt died on 27 September 2021 at the age of 83. His funeral was held on 14 October at Liverpool Cathedral.

Career statistics

Honours
Liverpool
Football League First Division: 1963–64, 1965–66
Football League Second Division: 1961–62
FA Cup: 1964–65
FA Charity Shield: 1964, 1965, 1966

England
FIFA World Cup: 1966

Individual
English Second Division Top Scorer: 1961–62
English First Division Top Scorer: 1965–66
English Football Hall of Fame: Inductee 2006
Liverpool Football Club Hall of Fame: Inductee

References

External links

 LFCHistory.net profile

1938 births
2021 deaths
English footballers
Association football forwards
England international footballers
Warrington Town F.C. players
Devizes Town F.C. players
Liverpool F.C. players
Bolton Wanderers F.C. players
Hellenic F.C. players
1962 FIFA World Cup players
1966 FIFA World Cup players
FIFA World Cup-winning players
UEFA Euro 1968 players
Members of the Order of the British Empire
People from Warrington (district)
English Football League players
English Football Hall of Fame inductees
English Football League representative players
FA Cup Final players
National Football League (South Africa) players
English expatriate footballers
English expatriate sportspeople in South Africa
Expatriate soccer players in South Africa